Tales from the Crypt was an American bi-monthly horror comic anthology series published by EC Comics from 1950 to 1955, producing 27 issues (the first issue with the title was #20, previously having been International Comics (#1–5);  International Crime Patrol (#6); Crime Patrol (#7–16) and The Crypt of Terror (#17–19) for a total of 46 issues in the series). Along with its sister titles, The Haunt of Fear and The Vault of Horror, Tales from the Crypt was popular, but in the late 1940s and early 1950s comic books came under attack from parents, clergymen, schoolteachers and others who believed the books contributed to illiteracy and juvenile delinquency. In April and June 1954, highly publicized congressional subcommittee hearings on the effects of comic books upon children left the industry shaken. With the subsequent imposition of a highly restrictive Comics Code, EC Comics publisher Bill Gaines cancelled Tales from the Crypt and its two companion horror titles, along with the company's remaining crime and science fiction series in September 1954.

Since their demise, all EC Comics titles have been reprinted at various times. Stories from the horror series have been adapted into other media, including a 1972 film and a television series that aired on HBO from 1989 to 1996. The later spawned two films—Demon Knight (1995) and Bordello of Blood (1996)—as well as a children's animated series, a game show, and a radio series.

Publication history 

Horror comics emerged as a distinct comic book genre after World War II when young adult males lost interest in caped crimebusters, and returning GIs wanted titillating sex and violence in their reading. One-shot Eerie (1947) is generally considered the first true horror comic, with its cover depicting a dagger-wielding, red-eyed ghoul threatening a rope-bound, scantily clad, voluptuous young woman beneath a full moon. In 1948, Adventures Into the Unknown became the first regularly published horror title, enjoying a nearly two decade life-span.
 
In 1950, EC publisher Gaines and his editor Al Feldstein discovered they shared similar tastes in horror and began experimenting with horror tales in their crime titles. Tales from the Crypt traces its origin to a Feldstein story, "Return from the Grave!", in EC's Crime Patrol (#15, December 1949/January 1950) with the Crypt-Keeper making his debut as host. Issue #16 featured more horror tales than crime stories, and, with issue #17, the title changed from Crime Patrol to The Crypt of Terror. Due to an attempt to save money on second-class postage permits, the numbering did not change with the title and continued as The Crypt of Terror for the next two issues.

Tales from the Crypt debuted with issue #20 (October/November 1950), producing a total of 27 issues (excluding the initial three issues, #17–19, published as The Crypt of Terror), before ceasing publication with its February/March 1955 issue (#46).

Demise
In 1954, Gaines and Feldstein intended to add a fourth book to their horror publications by reactivating an earlier title, The Crypt of Terror. They were stopped dead in their tracks, however. Following the publication of Fredric Wertham's Seduction of the Innocent, horror and other violent comics had come under scrutiny by parents, schoolteachers, clergymen, psychologists, and others who viewed the material as dangerous to the well-being of children and a significant contributor to the juvenile delinquency crisis in America. Matters came to a head in April and June 1954 with a highly publicized Senate Subcommittee on Juvenile Delinquency. Hearings targeted violent comic books—which fared poorly in the proceedings. While the committee stopped short of blaming the comics industry for juvenile delinquency, they did suggest it tone down the product. Publishers were left reeling.

The industry deftly avoided outside censorship by creating the self-regulatory Comics Magazine Association of America (CMAA) and a Comics Code Authority (CCA) that placed severe restrictions on violent comic book genres. Publishers were forbidden from using the words "terror" and "horror" in titles, for example, and forbidden from depicting zombies, werewolves, and other gruesome characters and outré horror fiction trappings. Gaines was fed up; he believed his titles were being specifically targeted and realized they were doomed to future failure. He threw in the towel, canceling Tales from the Crypt and its companion titles in September 1954. Since an issue of The Crypt of Terror had already been produced, it was published as the final issue of Tales from the Crypt, February/March 1955.

Reprints
Tales from the Crypt has been reprinted on numerous occasions. Ballantine Books reprinted selected Crypt stories in a series of paperback EC anthologies in 1964–66. The magazine was fully collected in a series of five black-and-white hardbacks by publisher Russ Cochran as part of The Complete EC Library in 1979.  Cochran (in association with Gladstone Publishing and solo) reprinted a handful of single color issues in 1990/91. Between September 1992 and December 1999, Cochran and Gemstone Publishing reprinted the full 30 individual issues. This complete run was later rebound, with covers included, in a series of six softcover EC Annuals. In 2007, Cochran and Gemstone began to publish hardcover, re-colored volumes of Tales from the Crypt as part of the EC Archives series. Three volumes (of a projected five) were published before Gemstone's financial troubles left the project in limbo. The project was then revived under a new publisher, Dark Horse Comics, which has resumed it with the release of Tales from the Crypt Volume 4 in October 2013 and Tales from the Crypt Volume 5 in November 2014.

Revival
In 2007, Papercutz, an independent comics publisher managed by former Marvel Comics editor Jim Salicrup, began running a new series of original Tales from the Crypt comics.  The new version was announced at the year's New York Comic Con. The first issue was published in June 2007, with a cover drawn by Kyle Baker.  All three of EC Comics' horror hosts (The GhouLunatics) appear in the issue, drawn by Rick Parker (artist of Marvel/MTV's Beavis and Butt-Head Comic Book). Contributors to subsequent issues have included well-known horror talents Joe R. Lansdale and his brother John L. Lansdale, Don McGregor, husband and wife team James Romberger and Marguerite Van Cook, Mort Todd, and Chris Noeth. The new version has a smaller digest size with a graphic novel style book binding. Controversy erupted in 2008 when vice presidential candidate Sarah Palin was featured on a cover attacking the horror hosts with a hockey stick, published with a letter from William Gaines' daughter Cathy Gaines Mifsud commenting on censorship.

As of today, there have been a total of 13 issues (9 graphic novels) published by Papercutz, with the last issue being published September 28, 2010.

In 2016, Super Genius Comics would relaunch Tales from the Crypt  for two issues.

Production

Creative team
Early front covers were created by Feldstein, Johnny Craig and Wally Wood, with the remaining covers (1952–55) by Jack Davis. The contributing interior artists were Craig, Feldstein, Wood, Davis, George Evans, Jack Kamen, Graham Ingels, Harvey Kurtzman, Al Williamson, Joe Orlando, Reed Crandall, Bernard Krigstein, Will Elder, Fred Peters and Howard Larsen. Jack Davis took over the art for the Crypt-Keeper stories with (#24, June/July, 1951), and continued as the title's lead artist for the rest of the run. Feldstein devised the Crypt-Keeper's origin story "Lower Berth!" (#33) which was illustrated by Davis. Issue #38 was one of two covers from EC's horror comics censored prior to publication. While The Vault of Horror cover for issue #32 was restored in Russ Cochran's EC Library reprints, the Tales from the Crypt cover remained censored. "Kamen's Kalamity" (#31) starred many members of the EC staff, including Gaines, Feldstein and the story's artist, Kamen. Ingels, Davis and Craig also made cameo appearances in the story in single panels which they drew themselves.

Influences and adaptations
As with the other EC comics edited by Feldstein, the stories in this comic were primarily based on Gaines using existing horror stories and films to develop "springboards" from which he and Feldstein could launch new stories. Specific story influences that have been identified include the following:

 "Death Must Come" (issue 17): Ralph Murphy's The Man in Half Moon Street
 "The Maestro's Hand" (issue 18): Robert Florey's The Beast with Five Fingers
 "The Thing from the Sea" (issue 20): F. Marion Crawford's "The Upper Berth"
 "Rx Death" (issue 20): Arthur Machen's "The Novel of the White Powder"
 "Impending Doom" (issue 20): W. F. Harvey's "August Heat"
 "Reflection of Death" (issue 23): H. P. Lovecraft's "The Outsider"
 "The Living Death" (issue 24): Edgar Allan Poe's "The Facts in the Case of M. Valdemar"
 "Judy, You're Not Yourself Tonight" (issue 25): H. P. Lovecraft's "The Thing on the Doorstep"
 "Loved to Death" (issue 25): John Collier's "The Chaser"
 "Grounds... for Horror!" (issue 29) – John Collier's "Thus I Refute Beelzy"
 "A Hollywood Ending" (issue 30): H. P. Lovecraft's "Cool Air"
 "Mirror, Mirror on the Wall" (issue 34): H. P. Lovecraft's "The Outsider"
 "Dead Right!" (issue 37): Joseph Sheridan Le Fanu's "The Room in the Dragon Volant"
 "Last Laugh" (issue 38): David H. Keller's "The Doorbell"
 "Shadow of Death" (issue 39): Carl Theodor Dreyer's Vampyr

Anecdotes from Bennett Cerf's Try and Stop Me were sources for stories, including "House of Horror" (issue 21), "Death Suited Him!" (issue 21) and "Death's Turn!" (issue 22).

After their unauthorized adaptation of one of Ray Bradbury's stories in another magazine, Bradbury contacted EC about their plagiarism of his work. They reached an agreement for EC to do authorized versions of Bradbury's short fiction.  These official adaptations include:

 "There Was an Old Woman" (issue 34)
 "The Handler" (issue 36)

The Crypt-Keeper

Although EC's horror stable consisted of three separate magazines, there was little beyond their titles to distinguish them.  Each magazine had its titular host, but the hosting duties for any one issue were typically shared with the hosts of the other two.  Thus, a single issue of Tales from the Crypt would contain two stories told by the Crypt-Keeper, one by the Vault-Keeper (of The Vault of Horror) and one by the Old Witch (of The Haunt of Fear). The professional rivalry among these three GhouLunatics was often played for comic effect.

The Crypt-Keeper was the primary host of Tales from the Crypt.  He was introduced to the public in Crime Patrol #15, and he continued with that magazine through its changes in title and format.  He was a frightening presence in those early issues, a sinister hermit sitting framed in the lightless crypt's half-open door, his face all but hidden by the double curtain of his long white hair.  But he soon evolved into a more comedic horror host, delivering an irreverent and pun-filled commentary to lighten the horrific tone of the stories he introduced.

The Crypt-Keeper's duties were not limited to hosting.  He would occasionally appear as a character as well, and these appearances give the reader a glimpse of his biography.  "The Lower Berth" (Tales from the Crypt #33) gives an account of the circumstances surrounding his birth.  "While the Cat's Away" (The Vault of Horror #34) conducts a tour of his house above and below ground.  "Horror beneath the Streets" (The Haunt of Fear #17) tells how he and his fellow GhouLunatics got their EC publishing contracts.

The Crypt-Keeper also served as the host of EC's 3-D comic book, Three Dimensional Tales from the Crypt of Terror.

The character is portrayed by Ralph Richardson in the 1972 film and, more famously, by John Kassir in the 1989 television series.

Media adaptations
The 1972 film from Amicus Productions features five stories from various EC comics. "Reflection of Death" (#23) and "Blind Alleys" (#46) were adapted for the film, the others were adapted from The Haunt of Fear and The Vault of Horror. A second Amicus film, The Vault of Horror, also used stories from Tales from the Crypt and Shock SuspenStories (despite its title, it did not use any stories published in the Vault of Horror comic). An homage film entitled Creepshow followed, paying tribute to the tone, look, and feel of Tales from the Crypt and other EC comics, without directly adapting any of the stories.

In 1989, the book was adapted into the HBO TV series Tales from the Crypt, which features John Kassir as the Cryptkeeper and included comic book covers designed to look like the original 1950s covers by Mike Vosburg with at least one drawn by Shawn McManus.

The following tales were used in HBO's Tales from the Crypt television series: "The Man Who Was Death" (issue #17), "Mute Witness to Murder" (#18), "Fatal Caper" (#20), "The Thing From The Grave" (#22), "Last Respects" (#23), "Judy, You're Not Yourself Today" (#25), "Loved to Death" (#25), "Well Cooked Hams" (#27), "The Ventriloquist's Dummy" (#28), "Korman's Kalamity" (re-titling of "Kamen's Kalamity", issue #31), "Cutting Cards" (#32), "Lower Berth" (#33), "None But The Lonely Heart" (#33), "Oil's Well That Ends Well" (#34), "Curiosity Killed" (#36), "Only Skin Deep" (#38), "Mournin' Mess" (#38), "Undertaking Palor" (#39), "Food For Thought" (#40), "Operation Friendship" (#41), "Cold War" (#43), "Forever Ambergris" (#44), "The Switch" (#45) and "Blind Alleys" (#46). Other episodes were based on other entries in the EC Comics line: The Vault of Horror, The Haunt of Fear, Crime SuspenStories, Shock SuspenStories and Two-Fisted Tales.

In 1993, Tales from the Crypt was adapted into a Saturday morning cartoon series entitled Tales from the Cryptkeeper, based on the series (albeit with none of the violence or other questionable content that was in the original series), with Kassir as the Cryptkeeper again; it ran from September 18, 1993 to December 4, 1999.

In 1994, Ace Novelty released a board game based on Tales from the Cryptkeeper called Tales from the Cryptkeeper: Search for the Lost Tales.

In late 1993, a pinball machine titled Tales from the Crypt was produced under license by Data East.

In 1996, a Saturday morning game show called Secrets of the Cryptkeeper's Haunted House ran from September 14 to August 1997, with Kassir once again in the role of the Cryptkeeper as announcer.

Two films by Universal Studios, Demon Knight (1995) and Bordello of Blood (1996), were based on the series, neither of which was particularly successful with critics. A third film, Ritual, was slated for theatrical release in 2001, but was only distributed internationally (without the Tales from the Crypt connection) until 2006 when it was released on DVD in the United States, with the Cryptkeeper segments restored. Unlike the 1970s-era Amicus films, these films were not based on stories from any of the EC comics. The Frighteners was intended to be another film in the series, but executive producer Robert Zemeckis decided to release it as a standalone film.

In 2012 the Cryptkeeper hosted FEARnet's Tales from the Crypt New Years Shockin' Eve Marathon. Voice actor John Kassir continued to play him along with puppeteer and programmer Tim Lewis and Ian Murray.

In early 2016, it was announced M. Night Shyamalan is producing a reboot of the 1989 TV series as part of TNT's new horror block. In June 2017, it was announced that the plans for the reboot have been shelved due to licensing issues.

Issue guide

References

External links
 Steve Stiles' history of Tales from the Crypt
 Chris Noeth Papercutz comic artist on issue #4 and #7 of the new Tales from the Crypt comic series
 Tales from the Crypt audio adaptations

Comics magazines published in the United States
EC Comics publications
1950 comics debuts
1955 comics endings
Fantasy comics
Horror comics
 
American comics adapted into films
Comics adapted into television series
Comics about magic
Comics by Carl Wessler
Comics by Gardner Fox
Vampires in comics
Werewolf comics
Zombies in comics
Magazines established in 1950
Magazines disestablished in 1955
Comics anthologies
Papercutz (publisher) titles